Phelps County is the name of two counties in the United States:

 Phelps County, Missouri 
 Phelps County, Nebraska